Voksino is a rural locality (a village) in Vorobyovskoye Rural Settlement, Sokolsky District, Vologda Oblast, Russia. The population was 15 as of 2002.

Geography 
Voksino is located 67 km northeast of Sokol (the district's administrative centre) by road. Preobrazhenskoye is the nearest rural locality.

References 

Rural localities in Sokolsky District, Vologda Oblast